Corazones de fuego ("Hearts of Fire") is a Colombian television anthology drama series, broadcast three times a week on daytime between 1992 and 1994 on the state-owned channel Cadena Uno. It was produced by Producciones Tevecine.

All episodes were self-conclusive, and many dealt, besides the typical melodrama topics, with the mysterious and supernatural, particularly in the 1992 season.

Re-runs 

In 2016, reruns of Corazones de fuego air in the early mornings on Canal Uno.

References

External links 

 Corazones de Fuego - Season 1 - Episode 1 
 Corazones de Fuego - Final Season - Final Episode 
 Corazones de Fuego - Full Episodes

1990s Colombian television series
1992 Colombian television series debuts
1994 Colombian television series endings
Colombian anthology television series